Floradalia is a genus of parasitic flies in the family Tachinidae.

Species
Floradalia major Thompson, 1963
Floradalia minor Thompson, 1963

References

Diptera of North America
Dexiinae
Tachinidae genera
Insects of Trinidad and Tobago